Michael Rolfe (born 14 September 1962) is a former Australian rules footballer who played with Richmond and Footscray in the Victorian Football League (VFL).

Notes

External links 

Living people
1962 births
Australian rules footballers from Victoria (Australia)
Richmond Football Club players
Western Bulldogs players
Echuca Football Club players